Ethan David Lawrence (born 28 September 1992) is an English actor. He is known for playing the roles of Joe Poulter in the BBC series Bad Education and James in the Netflix black comedy series After Life. Since 2021, he has played various characters in the CBBC children's comedy sketch show Horrible Histories.

Life and career
Ethan David Lawrence was born on 28 September 1992 in Maldon, Essex where he attended Plume School. Prior to his acting career, Lawrence studied Drama and Creative Writing at Royal Holloway, University of London.

In 2012, he was cast as Joe Poulter in the BBC Three sitcom Bad Education, which ran for three series. In 2014, he played Ryan in Sky Living comedy series Trying Again. In 2015, he made his film debut playing the role as Fraser in Friday Download: The Movie and later that year, he reprised the role of Joe in the film adaption of Bad Education, The Bad Education Movie. Over the next few years, Lawrence made several guest appearances in television series such as Flat TV, Avatards and Doc Martin, and also had a small part as John in the 2017 film How to Talk to Girls at Parties. In 2018 however, he struggled to find steady acting work and got a job as a pizza delivery boy. In 2019, he had a recurring role in the first series of Ricky Gervais' black comedy-drama series After Life as a teenager who played the recorder with his nose that was interviewed for the newspaper. The character was later established as James and became a regular character in the second and third series. In 2021, he appeared in an episode of Murder, They Hope as Ray. That same year, he began playing various characters in the CBBC comedy sketch show, Horrible Histories. In 2022, he is set to appear as Trotter in the film adaption of Stephen Fry's 1991 novel, The Liar.

Filmography

References

External links
 

1992 births
21st-century English male actors
English male television actors
Living people
People from Maldon, Essex
Alumni of Royal Holloway, University of London